Androscoggin Bancorp, Inc. is a bank headquartered in Lewiston, Maine with 12 branches in the Portland-Lewiston-South Portland, Maine Combined Statistical Area. They have owned the naming rights to the Androscoggin Bank Colisée since 2006.

References

External links

1870 establishments in Maine
Banks based in Maine
Banks established in 1870
Companies based in Lewiston, Maine